Patrick Gada (born 5 May 1978) is a Zimbabwean cricketer. He made his first-class debut in the 1998/99 season.

References

External links
 

1978 births
Living people
Zimbabwean cricketers
Centrals cricketers
Manicaland cricketers
Mashonaland cricketers
Sportspeople from Harare